Eric's Ultimate Solitaire (also known as Eric's Ultimate Solitaire X) is a commercial solitaire game developed by Delta Tao Software for the Macintosh. The game was later ported to Linux by Loki Software.

Apple Computer bundled the game with some Macintosh systems.

As of January 4, 2012, Delta Tao Software had not released an update compatible with Apple's Mac OS 10.7 (Lion) operating system.
As of November 21, 2013, Sniderware released Eric's All-in-1 Solitaire as its successor.

References

External links
Eric's Ultimate Solitaire - Delta Tao Software
Eric's Ultimate Solitaire - Loki Software

Casual games
Classic Mac OS games
Linux games
Loki Entertainment games
MacOS games
Patience video games
Video games developed in the United States
Windows games
Delta Tao Software games